Paul Lee is a Canadian video game developer, venture capitalist, businessman and entrepreneur. He is the former President of Electronic Arts, a video game and interactive software company.

Early life and education
Lee is of Chinese heritage and born and raised in Vancouver. He received an undergraduate degree from the University of British Columbia, with a Bachelor of Commerce with Honours, and was one of six students selected to enter the prestigious Portfolio Management Fund program at the UBC Sauder School of Business, where he was a Leslie Wong Fellow.

Before his career as a game developer got off the ground, Lee worked as an investment manager at Chrysler Canada managing its pension fund, corporate cash, and health and welfare trust. During his school days, Lee worked at his father’s Vancouver restaurant, Dragon Inn and at Save on Foods.

Career
He joined Electronic Arts in 1991 and became an executive when it bought Distinctive Software, a leading independent video game developer where he was part owner. He was the President of Worldwide Studios of EA from 2005 to 2007, where he was responsible for product development in 14 studios. managing 6,000 employees and $1 billion in annual capital.

He is Founder and Managing Partner of Vanedge Capital, a venture capital firm in Vancouver. Founded in 2010, the $137 million venture capital fund Vanedge backed Wurldtech, which was acquired by General Electric in 2014; Recon Instruments, which was acquired by Intel in 2015; Mediacore, which was acquired by Workday in 2015, Privacy Analytics, which was acquired by IMS Health in 2016.  Other notable investments by Vanedge include Unity, SpaceX, OmniSci, Plotly, Echodyne, Vendasta, Planet and Go-Jek.

Prior to Vanedge Capital and while at Electronic Arts, Lee was a notable angel investor in the technology scene in BC, with investments in companies such as ALI Technologies, acquired by McKesson, Blast Radius acquired by WPP, Bycast acquired by NetApps, Active State acquired by Sophos, among others such as DWave Systems.

Lee talked about the lack of venture capital support for startups in British Columbia, and the reasons he decided to found a venture capital firm there in an interview with BC Business.

Boards
Vancouver Board of Trade
Chair of DigiBC
Canada's representatives to Asia Pacific Economic Council's Business Advisory Council
Dean's Advisory Council at the UBC Sauder School of Business
Co-chair of Premier's Technology Council
D-Wave Systems
Premier's Jobs and Economic Investment Council

Awards
Outstanding Young Alumnus Award from the University of British Columbia. (1996)
British Columbia Technology Industries Association Person of the Year Award in 2002.
Golden Jubilee of Her Majesty Queen Elizabeth II. (2003)
Honorary Fellow of the University of British Columbia's Sauder School of Business.

References

Living people
Businesspeople from Vancouver
Canadian entertainment industry businesspeople
Canadian venture capitalists
Canadian people of Chinese descent
Canadian technology chief executives
CFA charterholders
Electronic Arts employees
University of Adelaide alumni
UBC Sauder School of Business alumni
University of New South Wales alumni
Video game businesspeople
Year of birth missing (living people)